Nicotianamine is a metal-chelating molecule ubiquitous in higher plants. It is also used as a precursor for the synthesis of phytosiderophores which play a key role in iron uptake from the soil in graminaceous plants.  Biochemically, it is synthesized by the enzyme nicotianamine synthase, which uses three molecules of S-adenosylmethionine.

References

Siderophores
Amino acids